Bert White may refer to:

Bert White (Australian footballer) (1906–1988), Australian rules footballer with Fitzroy
Berta Lee White (1914–2004), Mississippi politician
Henry White (footballer, born 1895) (1895–1972), English association football player

See also
Albert White (disambiguation)
Robert White (disambiguation)
Herbert White (disambiguation)
Hubert White (disambiguation)